Ruslan Yuryevich Nakhushev (born 5 September 1984) is a Russian former professional footballer.

Life and career
Nakhushev was born on 5 September 1984 in Nalchik, Russian SFSR, to Circassian (Kabardian) parents.

He played 2 games for the PFC CSKA Moscow main squad in the Russian Premier League Cup. He also played 1 game in the UEFA Intertoto Cup 2008 for FC Saturn Moscow Oblast.

Personal life
Ruslan Nakhushev is married to Alena Nakhusheva. The couple have two children: a son (born July 2009) and a daughter (born 6 May 2012).

Honours and achievements

Khimki
 Russian Cup finalist: 2004–05

Mordovia
 National Football League (FNL) winner: 2015–16

References

External links
 Player page on the official FC Saturn Moscow Oblast website 
 

1984 births
Circassian people of Russia
Living people
Association football defenders
Sportspeople from Nalchik
PFC CSKA Moscow players
PFC Spartak Nalchik players
Russian footballers
Russian Premier League players
Russia under-21 international footballers
FC Anzhi Makhachkala players
FC Khimki players
FC Krasnodar players
FC Lokomotiv Moscow players
FC Mordovia Saransk players
FC Saturn Ramenskoye players
FC Tom Tomsk players